It's My Party may refer to:

"It's My Party" (Lesley Gore song), a 1963 number-one single, covered by Dave Stewart and Barbara Gaskin
"It's My Party" (Jessie J song), a 2013 single
It's My Party (film), a 1996 film
It's My Party!, an American girl group
"It's My Party", a song by Bret Michaels from his album Songs of Life
It's My Party (tour), a 2019 concert tour by Jennifer Lopez